David Bologna is an American actor, dancer and singer. Beginning conducting performance at the age of seven, Bologna became a Tony Award nominee at the age of fourteen as the Best Featured Actor in a Musical for his Broadway debut as Billy's flamboyant best friend Michael in Billy Elliot the Musical.

Life and career
Born and raised in New Orleans, Bologna is the son of Rick Bologna and Holly Bologna. Their home was flooded when Hurricane Katrina hit New Orleans, and the family moved to Austin, Texas.

He was active in local theatre productions, including Bye Bye Birdie at Le Petit Theatre du Vieux Carre, “Seussical the Musical” with Brandt Blocker Presents at Six Flags New Orleans, and Peter Pan, until Hurricane Katrina forced his family to relocate to Austin, Texas. In Texas he performed with the Zachary Scott Theatre and the youth theatre kidsActing Studio and appeared in multiple productions, including Beauty and the Beast, Grease, and Cabaret.

He is a two-time winner of the North American Irish Dancing Championships and placed fifth in the World Irish Dance Championships. He also won the Big Easy Entertainment Award for his performances in Oliver! and The Music Man.

On November 13, 2008, Billy Elliot the Musical opened on Broadway featuring Bologna alternating in the role of Michael with Frank Dolce. Although the three actors who portrayed Billy shared the Tony nomination for Best Leading Actor in a Musical, Bologna alone was nominated as Best Featured Actor in a Musical, as he had been the one to "debut" the role in the first "official" performance.  Bologna's last performance in Billy Elliot was on September 27, 2009, however he returned to perform the role of Michael on June 16, 2010 for a limited engagement which lasted until August 8, 2010.

In May 2017, Bologna graduated with a Bachelor of Arts degree from the Gallatin School of Individualized Study at New York University.

Awards

References

External links

21st-century American male actors
21st-century American male singers
21st-century American singers
American male child actors
American male dancers
American male musical theatre actors
American male stage actors
Living people
Male actors from New Orleans
Year of birth missing (living people)